Blanda Power Station is a dam and hydroelectric on the Blanda River within the northern edge of the highlands in Iceland.

The Blanda Station came on-line in 1991. It is located on the northern edge of the high-lands near the end of the Kjalvegur Mountain Road. To the north is a view over the Blöndu-dalur Valley where the River Blanda flows out to the sea near the town of Blönduós. The Blanda Station is an underground plant, located approximately 230 metres below the surface.

References

Hydroelectric power stations in Iceland
Dams in Iceland
Energy infrastructure completed in 1992
1992 establishments in Iceland
Earth-filled dams